Gregorio Lazzarini (1657 – 10 November 1730) was an Italian painter of mythological, religious and historical subjects, as well as portraits. One of the most successful Venetian artists of the day, a prominent teacher, and father to a significant school of painting, he is best known for having first trained Giambattista Tiepolo, who joined his workshop in 1710 at the age of fourteen.  His own style was somewhat eclectic.

Life
Born in Venice, the son of a barber, he was the brother of the proficient painter, Elisabetta Lazzarini (1662–1729). He trained initially with the Genovese painter Francesco Rosa, then with Girolamo Forabosco, and lastly in the studio of Pietro della Vecchia.

He joined the painters' guild in Venice in 1687. Active in Venice until at least 1715, he spent most of his life in the Venetian Republic. He was a prolific painter. He was reputed to be a patient teacher who imparted a broad knowledge of artistic styles for the portrayal of mythological and historical subjects; according to his contemporary biographer, Vincenzo da Canal, "the young who desired to get ahead in the pictorial arts chose Lazzarini as their master". Other pupils of Lazzarini included Gaspare Diziani and Bartolomeo Ignazio Capello.

Some of his works decorate the Sala dello Scrutinio of the Doge’s Palace in Venice. A group of his paintings are on view inside the Sala San Tommaso at the basilica of Santi Giovanni e Paolo. Among his major works is a canvas depicting the Charity of San Lorenzo Giustiniani for the Patriarcal house at San Pietro di Castello. His overtly academic style, which changed little during his career, combined the solidity of Emilian painting of the Baroque period with the rich colours of the Venetian school.

Lazzarini died on 10 November 1730 in Villabona Veronese (now Villa d'Adige in Badia Polesine), having moved there in September to stay with his brother, the local priest.

Notes and references
Notes

References

Further reading

External links

Gregorio Lazzarini at ArtCyclopedia

1657 births
1730 deaths
17th-century Italian painters
Italian male painters
18th-century Italian painters
Painters from Venice
Italian Baroque painters
18th-century Italian male artists